Otto Octavius is a fictional character portrayed by Alfred Molina in Spider-Man 2 (2004) and later in the Marvel Cinematic Universe (MCU) film Spider-Man: No Way Home (2021), based on the Marvel Comics character of the same name. Octavius is introduced in Spider-Man 2 as a nuclear physicist and friend and mentor of Peter Parker, whose research into fusion power with his wife Rosie (portrayed by Donna Murphy) is being sponsored by Oscorp's genetic and scientific research division, headed by Harry Osborn.

When Octavius' fusion reactor experiment using tritium becomes unstable, resulting in Rosie's death, the harness of powerful robotic tentacle arms equipped with artificial intelligence (AI) which he was using to safely handle the materials is fused to his body, burning the inhibitor chip keeping the arms from controlling his nervous system. After ending up in the hospital and massacring the surgeons attempting to save Octavius by sawing them off, the arms' AI begin influencing his mind and convince him to steal funds in order to attempt the experiment again, over the course of which crime spree the Daily Bugle dubs him Doctor Octopus, or "Doc Ock" for short. Along the way, he comes into conflict with Spider-Man, with Osborn offering to give Octavius the tritium he needs to complete his experiment in exchange for handing Spider-Man over to him. Ultimately, as the experiment begins to destroy New York City, Spider-Man reveals himself as Peter to Octavius after damaging his arms, and inspires him to regain control of them and sacrifice himself to sink the fusion reactor into the East River, where he presumably drowns.

The character returns in Spider-Man: No Way Home, being transported into another universe shortly before his redemption and death, due to a magic spell gone wrong causing a rupture in the multiverse, and ends up clashing with that universe's Spider-Man and his allies. After the other universe Spider-Man and his closest friend, colleague and Harry's father Norman replaces his faulty inhibitor chip with a working one, Octavius regains control of his arms and mental state like he did before his original death, and joins Spider-Man and two alternate versions of him in fighting other universe-displaced supervillains, including Norman's alter ego Green Goblin. After briefly reuniting with his version of Spider-Man, now older, Octavius is returned to his universe. Molina has expressed further interest in reprising the role in the in-development Sony's Spider-Man Universe (SSU) film based on The Sinister Six.

Molina's performance as the character, considered one of the earliest portrayals of Octavius as a tragic villain, has been positively received by critics and audiences, and the character has come to be considered to be one of the most iconic villains in superhero films.

Concept and creation

The character of Otto Octavius / Doctor Octopus first appeared in print in The Amazing Spider-Man #3 (July 1963), and was created by writer Stan Lee and artist Steve Ditko. Lee recounted: "usually in creating a villain the first thing I would think of was a name, and then I would try to think of, 'Well, now that I've got the name, who's the character going to be and what will he do?' For some reason, I thought of an octopus. I thought, 'I want to call somebody Octopus. And I want him to have a couple of extra arms just for fun'. But I had to figure out how to do that". The character soon re-appeared in The Amazing Spider-Man #11-12 and then again in #31-33, becoming a fan favorite.

Otto Octavius was originally intended to be the secondary antagonist of Spider-Man (2002), but director Sam Raimi eventually dropped the concept in favor of spending more time with Harry and Norman Osborn. Raimi decided to use Octavius as the main antagonist of Spider-Man 2 (2004) due to being both a visually interesting villain and a character who could be seen as sympathetic.
Before Alfred Molina was cast in the role several actors were considered for the role, including Ed Harris, Chris Cooper (who would later portray Norman Osborn in The Amazing Spider-Man 2), and Christopher Walken; In February 2003, Molina was cast as Octavius for the film, undergoing physical training for the role.

Raimi had been impressed by his performance in Frida (2002) and also felt that his large physical size was true to the comic book character. Molina was unaware that he was a strong contender for the role, only briefly discussing it. He was excited to get the role, being a big fan of Marvel Comics. Although he was not familiar with Doc Ock, Molina wanted to maintain the cruel, sardonic sense of humor the character had in the comics.

Special effects
The claws of each tentacle, which were called "death flowers", were controlled by one puppeteer sitting on a chair. Each tentacle was controlled by four people, who rehearsed every scene with Molina so that they could give a natural sense of movement as if the tentacles were moving due to Octavius' muscle movement. On set, Molina referred to his tentacles as "Larry", "Harry", "Moe" and "Flo".

For Spider-Man: No Way Home (2021), Doctor Octopus' mechanical tentacles were created through CGI instead of puppetry. According to Tom Holland, Molina had to subsequently "relearn" how to act using them.

Return of the character
Molina first expressed interest in portraying the character again in The Amazing Spider-Man series. In an August 2014 interview, while promoting Love Is Strange (2014), Molina expressed his openness to return as Doctor Octopus in a film based on the Sinister Six, then-intended for a 2016 release, after the character's appearance in that film was teased at the end of The Amazing Spider-Man 2 (2014), but reflected that the filmmakers could choose to go for another actor. By September 2019, an untitled The Sinister Six film had re-entered development, Amy Pascal stating the following October that it would feature villains of Marvel Studios' Spider-Man films. By September 2021, the film was confirmed to be in active development, to be set in Sony's Spider-Man Universe.

After The Amazing Spider-Man film series was cancelled, Sony Pictures and Marvel Studios announced in February 2015 that Spider-Man would appear in the MCU, with the character appearing in an MCU film and Sony releasing a Spider-Man film co-produced by Feige and Pascal. Sony Pictures would continue to own, finance, distribute, and exercise final creative control over the Spider-Man films. "For the first few films, it was always, 'How do we do things that have never been done before?' It did not occur to us to do a new Goblin story, or to do an Oscorp story, or to do Doc Ock, or anyone that had been done before, which is why Vulture and Mysterio were really the key characters," Marvel Studios president Kevin Feige reflected. Feige conceded "you can't get better than Alfred Molina as Doc Ock" and furthered that if they "were ever going to bring Doc Ock back, it would have to be Alfred Molina and in early development on this third Homecoming movie, we realized that thanks to the MCU, there was a way to do that."

In December 2020, it was reported that Molina would reprise his role as the character in Spider-Man: No Way Home (2021), which is intended to be set in the Marvel Cinematic Universe. In April 2021, Molina confirmed his involvement with film, calling it "wonderful" to reprise his role. He also revealed that Octavius's story in the film would pick up mere moments after the events of Spider-Man 2. Molina was digitally de-aged in the film to resemble how he appeared in 2004, despite his concerns about his fighting style not looking realistic due to his age in a similar way to Robert De Niro's character in The Irishman (2019).

Fictional character biography

Early life 
Otto Octavius is a brilliant nuclear physicist, a friend of Dr. Curt Connors, and a scientific idol of Peter Parker, who aims to write his college paper on him. His work is connected to and funded by Oscorp, run by Norman Osborn, whom Octavius knew. Years later, Osborn would become the Green Goblin after an experiment involving super-soldiers gone wrong and die while fighting Spider-Man; Octavius later attended his funeral. Despite this, Octavius continues his work with his wife and lab assistant, Rosie.

Becoming Doctor Octopus

Two years later, Parker meets Octavius through Norman's son and the former’s best friend Harry Osborn. Octavius initially dismisses Parker until he remembers that Oscorp funds his research and that Parker is the "brilliant but lazy" student of Dr. Curt Connors, after which Octavius takes a liking to Parker because of his intelligence and shared interests. Octavius creates an artificial sun with four mechanical tentacles controlled by a back-mounted harness and a neural inhibitor chip on his neck as part of a fusion reactor experiment using tritium. However, the experiment goes awry, resulting in Rosie's death, the harness being fused to his body, and the inhibitor chip controlling the arms being destroyed. Octavius ends up in the hospital, but the arms', no longer under the control of the inhibitor chip, artificial intelligence (AI) massacre the surgeons attempting to save him and convince him to steal funds and attempt the experiment again.

Along the way, he comes into conflict with Spider-Man and offers to bring him to Harry in exchange for more tritium. To lure Spider-Man, Octavius kidnaps Mary Jane Watson and battles him atop an elevated train, which he sends careening out of control. Octavius takes Spider-Man captive, delivers him to Harry, keeps Watson as a hostage, and begins another attempt at the fusion reactor experiment. Spider-Man arrives to stop him and damages the arms before revealing his identity as Parker to remind Octavius of how he believed intelligence should be used for good. Inspired by Parker's words, Octavius regains control of his arms and sacrifices himself to sink the fusion reactor into the East River.

Entering an alternate reality 

In the alternate reality of Earth-616, Dr. Stephen Strange casts a spell to erase people's memories of that reality's Peter Parker's (later nicknamed "Peter-One") identity as Spider-Man after it was revealed by Mysterio. However, Peter-One's frequent alterations causes the spell to bring in people from across the multiverse who knew Parker's identity, including Octavius while strangling his version of Parker (nicknamed "Peter-Two"), moments before the latter can redeem Octavius and stop his experiment. After being transported to this new reality, Octavius encounters Peter-One on the Alexander Hamilton Bridge. Believing Peter-One is his Spider-Man and that he did something with his fusion reactor, Octavius battles him and steals a piece of his nanotechnological Iron Spider suit, upgrading his arms. After discovering Peter-One is not his Parker, Octavius loses control of his arms when Peter-One uses the stolen nanotechnology to hack into them. Peter-One interrogates Octavius, but they are interrupted by the Green Goblin, whom Octavius recognizes as Osborn.

Strange teleports the two of them to the New York Sanctum and locks Octavius in a cell next to an alternate version of Curt Connors. Later, Octavius meets Max Dillon and Flint Marko, and reunites with Osborn; the two learn from Marko that they both died while fighting their Spider-Man, which Octavius angrily refuses to believe, but was convinced, after realizing that his fight with his Spider-Man was the only thing he remembered before being brought to this universe. Strange however arrives and locks Osborn in another cell, preparing to send the villains back to their universes only for Peter-One to fight and trap the former in the Mirror Dimension, intending to cure them. Octavius is surprised at Peter-One's act and tells him he could have let them die, but MJ tells him that it was not who Spider-Man is. Hearing Peter-One's intentions to cure the villains, Octavius is reluctant, believing he does not need fixing.

Despite being reluctant, Octavius was convinced to come with Spider-Man, but protested when Peter-One told him that he was going to be cured first. Nonetheless, Peter-One and Osborn make a new inhibitor chip for him, as Spider-Man administrated it, which gives Octavius his humanity and control over his arms back. Octavius expressed his gratitude to Peter-One for his help, returns the nanites he absorbed back to Peter's suit and offers to help cure the remaining villains, but Osborn's Green Goblin personality takes control and convinces the uncured villains to fight back. Octavius attempts to stop them, but is blasted out of a building by Dillon and forced to escape. Later on, Octavius reunites with Parker and Peter-One before joining forces with them and a third version of Parker (nicknamed "Peter-Three") to cure Dillon and fight back against the Green Goblin. Afterwards, Strange returns the displaced individuals back to their native universes, with Octavius taking an arc reactor back with him.

In other media

Video games
 Molina reprises his role as Otto Octavius in the video game adaptation of Spider-Man 2.
 The film version of Otto Octavius appears as a playable character in Spider-Man: Friend or Foe, albeit voiced by Joe Alaskey. This version went through similar events, but survived his death. Octavius joins several of Spider-Man's enemies in an attempt to kill him, but they are attacked by a swarm of symbiote-like creatures called P.H.A.N.T.O.M.s created by Mysterio, which brainwash the villains and teleport them across the world, with Octavius being sent to Tokyo to build a P.H.A.N.T.O.M. generator. After Spider-Man is recruited by S.H.I.E.L.D. to stop the P.H.A.N.T.O.M.s, his journey takes him to Tokyo, where he frees Octavius from Mysterio's control. Following this, Octavius reluctantly joins forces with Spider-Man to stop Mysterio.

Reception and legacy
Alfred Molina's role in Spider-Man 2 was widely well-received. In May 2014, IndieWire ranked him as the 5th greatest film supervillain of all time. Additionally, Abraham Riesman of Vulture.com in his February 2018 list placed the character as number 16 in the rank of his 25 greatest movie supervillains. The special effects used for his robotic arms were also praised, with Roger Ebert calling it the film's "special-effects triumph". Chicago Tribune Mark Caro stated that Octavius was a "pleasingly complex" villain in Spider-Man 2, with Kenneth Turan of the Los Angeles Times concurring with Caro, opining, "Doc Ock grabs this film with his quartet of sinisterly serpentine mechanical arms and refuses to let go." IGN Richard George felt "Sam Raimi and his writing team delivered an iconic, compelling version of Spider-Man's classic foe... We almost wish there was a way to retroactively add some of these elements to the original character." Empire also praised Octavius as a "superior villain" in 2015.

The character’s revival in Spider-Man: No Way Home (2021) was spotlighted before the release of the film with a trailer. The reveal was cited as a highlight and inspired various Internet memes of the scene of Octavius saying "Hello, Peter".
Looking back at the Sam Raimi trilogy, Tom Holland, who portrays Spider-Man in the Marvel Cinematic Universe, praised Molina's performance in Spider-Man 2, noting that he was initially terrified of the character back when he saw Spider-Man 2 for the first time. Holland later expressed his enjoyment at later working with Molina in Spider-Man: No Way Home, calling Molina "one of [his] favorite people [he]'s ever worked with". Neil Soans, Peter Travers, and Jade King singled out Norman Osborn portrayer Willem Dafoe and Molina for praise, King asserting that the two stole "the show as Green Goblin and Doc Ock" and were "brilliant depictions of these characters".

Awards and nominations

Molina has received many nominations and awards for his portrayal of Otto Octavius.

See also 
 Characters of the Marvel Cinematic Universe
 Doctor Octopus

Notes

References

External links 
 
 
 Otto Octavius at the Marvel Cinematic Universe Wiki

Characters created by Sam Raimi
Cyborg supervillains
Fictional characters from New York (state)
Marvel Comics cyborgs
Fictional engineers
Fictional flexible weapons practitioners
Fictional inventors
Fictional mad scientists
Fictional physicians
Fictional nuclear physicists
Fictional scientists in films
Fictional technopaths
Film and television memes
Film characters introduced in 2004
Film supervillains
Internet memes introduced in 2021
Internet memes
Male film villains
Marvel Cinematic Universe characters
Marvel Comics characters who can move at superhuman speeds
Marvel Comics characters with superhuman strength
Marvel Comics scientists
Spider-Man (2002 film series)
Spider-Man film characters
Superhero film characters
Video game bosses